Gas is a 2004 comedy/drama film, directed by Henry Chan. The film stars Flex Alexander (One on One, Love... & Other 4 Letter Words) and Khalil Kain (Girlfriends, Love Jones).

Plot
Upon returning to Los Angeles to attend his father's funeral, Damon (Alexander) soon learns that in order to claim his share of the family inheritance he must work alongside his brother, Mookie (Kain) — a former drug-dealer who had previously cost Damon a college scholarship — in keeping the family's long-running gas station in business for at least one year. As the siblings repeatedly butt heads over matters both great and small, they soon come to realize that it takes more than money to hold a family together.

Cast
Flex Alexander — Damien
Khalil Kain — Mookie
Art Evans — Will
Brent Jennings — Mr. Garrison
Clyde Kusatsu — Mr. Sang
Gina Ravera — Reverend Sheila
J.B. Smoove — Ignatius
Jennifer Pae — Jee
Jessica Lugo — Maria
Jo Marie Payton-Noble — Loretta
Kelly Perine — Ed
Lil' Maxso — Lil' Max$o
Mike Batayeh — Hector
Sticky Fingaz — Craig
Tyson Beckford — Karl

Tagline
A highly combustible mix of laughter, heart and soul.

External links

2004 comedy-drama films
2004 films
African-American films
American comedy-drama films
2004 directorial debut films
Films set in Los Angeles
2000s English-language films
2000s American films